Cholzer Chancy (born 16 February 1967) is a Haitian politician. He was Speaker of the Chamber of Deputies between 11 January 2016 and 11 January 2018. He is a member of the political party Haiti in Action.

Career
Chancy was born on 16 February 1967 in Ennery, Artibonite. His parents were both farmers and Chancy aspired a career in agriculture. Chancy did however not manage to enter the faculty of agriculture at university and instead went to the l'Institut national d'administration, de gestion et des hautes études internationales (INAGHEI) in 1991. After studying Chancy became a businessman and owned a Texaco petrol station.

Chancy ran as a candidate of the party l'espace de concertation for the Chamber of Deputies in the 2000 parliamentary elections, he however retracted his candidacy for the second round. He was elected in the 2006 elections for the party Haiti in Action. Chancy was re-elected in the 2010 elections. During this term he served as president of the Finance commission.

On 11 January 2016 Chancy won the election of Speaker of the Chamber of Deputies, he obtained 46 votes while his opponent Jerry Tardieu of the Truth party obtained 44 votes. After his election Chancy was involved in seeking a solution to the political crisis in Haiti that occurred after the Presidential term of Michel Martelly had expired, and no new president was elected yet. After a vote in the Chamber of Deputies on 14 February Chancy declared Jocelerme Privert acting president.

In January 2017 Chancy was reelected as Speaker. He was succeeded as Speaker by Gary Bodeau on 11 January 2018.

References

1967 births
Living people
Haitian businesspeople
Haiti in Action politicians
Members of the Chamber of Deputies (Haiti)
People from Artibonite (department)
Presidents of the Chamber of Deputies (Haiti)